Van is a hamlet in Powys, Mid Wales, located to the north west of Llanidloes. Its name, an anglicisation of the local Welsh placename "" or in full "" (which are also used), is believed to originate from the names of two ancient farms in the area; Manledd Uchaf and Manledd Isaf.

The hamlet grew in the 19th century with the discovery of large deposits of lead, and a thriving lead mine was developed. At one point during the late 19th century 'Van Mine' was the most productive in Europe. The mines declined under pressure from foreign imports in the early 20th century plus mis-management, and operations ceased in the inter-war period. The name Van is also given to the small lake located just outside the village, Van Pool.

External links 
Photos of Van and surrounding area on geograph

Villages in Powys